The 2017 Boundary Ford Curling Classic was held from November 24 to 27 at the Lloydminster Curling Club in Lloydminster, Saskatchewan as part of the 2017–18 World Curling Tour. The event was held in a triple knockout format.

Teams
Teams are listed as follows:

Knockout results
The draw is listed as follows:

A event

B event

{{4TeamBracket-Compact-NoSeeds-Byes
| RD1= Second Knockout
| RD2= Qualifier 5
| team-width= 150

| RD1-team01=  Nancy Martin
| RD1-score01=10
| RD1-team02=  Sara England
| RD1-score02= 2
| RD1-team03=  Lindsay Makichuk
| RD1-score03= 7
| RD1-team04=  Jodi Marthaller
| RD1-score04=8

| RD2-team01=  Nancy Martin
| RD2-score01=' 7
| RD2-team02=  Jodi Marthaller
| RD2-score02= 6
}}

C event

 

Playoffs

FinalSunday, November 26''

References

External links

2017 in Canadian curling
Sport in Lloydminster
Curling competitions in Alberta
November 2017 sports events in Canada
2017 in Alberta